Cheung Shue Tau (Chinese: 樟樹頭) is a place at the north shore of Tsing Yi Island, Hong Kong. The place is with many ship repairing factories that were relocated from Cheung Sha Wan. It is reachable by Tam Kon Shan Road. An expressway Tsing Yi North Coastal Road has been built on the hill above it and a viaduct connecting to Tam Kon Shan Road.

References

Tsing Yi